The Chester County Courthouse is an historic county courthouse building located at 133 East Main Street, Court Square in Henderson, Chester County, Tennessee. Built in 1913 in the Classical Revival style of architecture. it is the third courthouse that Chester County has had, the previous ones having burned down. It is a two-story redbrick structure with a colonnaded front portico and a cupola in the center of its gabled roof. The original building has been added onto with an architecturally complementary extension on the rear. In 1973, it was featured in the movie Walking Tall, based on the life of McNairy County sheriff Buford Pusser. On March 26, 1979, it was added to the National Register of Historic Places.

References

External links

Neoclassical architecture in Tennessee
Government buildings completed in 1913
Buildings and structures in Chester County, Tennessee
County courthouses in Tennessee
Courthouses on the National Register of Historic Places in Tennessee
1913 establishments in Tennessee
National Register of Historic Places in Chester County, Tennessee